Amanda Blanc (born 1967) is a Welsh businesswoman who is the chief executive officer (CEO) of Aviva since July 2020. Aviva has 18.5 million customers across the UK, Ireland and Canada, £401 billion of group assets under management and 22,000 people. 

Blanc was previously CEO EMEA & Global Banking at Zurich and Group CEO AXA UK, PPP & Ireland at Axa. The first woman to chair the Association of British Insurers and a past president of the Chartered Insurance Institute, she has held a number of non-executive roles, including chair of the Welsh Professional Rugby Board.

Early life 
Blanc was born and brought up in Treherbert in the Rhondda valley. She and her sister attended Treorchy Comprehensive School. Both her grandfathers were miners. She studied Modern History at the University of Liverpool and later graduated from the University of Leeds with an MBA.

Career 
After graduating, she obtained a graduate role with Commercial Union (which later became part of Aviva) in Luton. Blanc went on to become a fleet and casualty underwriter, then an area development manager and the youngest and first woman to work as a Commercial Union branch manager. She left Commercial Union in 1999 for EY and soon after joined Axa for the first time as Regional Director. In December 2003, she joined Groupama, in the newly created role of distribution and customer services director.

In 2006 Blanc moved to Towergate Insurance, where she had responsibility for the retail broking division, and in 2010 she was promoted to deputy CEO. 

Blanc joined Axa in February 2011 to lead the commercial division, at a time when it was rumoured that the UK business was to be put up for sale by its French parent company. The business survived and was later held up by Axa Group as a best practice example. At this time, Blanc was received the Insurance Times 'CEOs CEO of the Year' award twice in three years (2013 and 2015). In 2015 she was given responsibility for the entire General Insurance division for Axa in UK & Ireland and then a year later became Group CEO AXA UK, PPP & Ireland.

Blanc was announced as CEO for Europe, the Middle East and Africa at Zurich in April 2018. A little over a year later she had resigned. Blanc did not comment on the reasons why but “personality clashes” between her and Group CEO Mario Greco were cited by sources. She was also required to step down as chair of the ABI as protocol dictates that only a sitting insurance CEO can hold the role.

Since leaving Zurich, Blanc has started in seven non-executive roles: three InsurTec startups – Laka, Trov and RightIndem, OSG, Aviva PLC, Chair of specialist Lloyd's of London motor insurer ERS, and chair of the Welsh Professional Rugby Board, a voluntary position.

Blanc was the first woman to chair the ABI, and was previously chair of the ABI General Insurance committee. She was the first woman to chair the Insurance Fraud Bureau and served as president of the Chartered Insurance Institute.  In April 2020 Blanc was asked by the Government to lead a review into the 2019 floods. The report was published in November 2020. Blanc is also a member of the FCA Practitioner Panels.

On March 17, 2021, Blanc was appointed HM Treasury's Women in Finance Champion, succeeding Dame Jayne-Anne Gadhia. As part of the role, she is tasked with promoting the UK government's Women in Finance Charter, which aims to boost gender diversity across UK financial services.

On 11 November 2021, Blanc joined the Geneva Association as a new board member, one of only two women on the board of directors of the insurance industry think tank.

In February 2022, she was appointed to UK Prime Minister Boris Johnson's new Business Council, advising the government on matters such as recovery from COVID-19 and unlocking global investment.

On April 25, 2022, she was announced as co-chair of the UK Transition Plan Taskforce to develop the "gold standard" for UK firms’ climate transition plans.

On 1 September 2022, Amanda joined the board of energy company BP as a non-executive director.

Media
Amanda was the guest on the long running BBC Radio 4 series Desert Island Discs, hosted by Lauren Laverne in March 2023.

Charity work 
Amanda represents Aviva as WWF's lead strategic partner in the insurance and pensions sector in both the UK and Canada.

Awards 
Amanda Blanc was named Woman of Achievement in 2008 by Women in the City. The award recognises senior level women who actively promote and encourage the progress of women above and beyond their everyday job.

Blanc was also featured in Yahoo! Finance's 2019 HERoes Women Role Model Executives list due to her efforts to drive gender equality in the workplace, and in Forbes' 2021 Power Women list, which showcases the world's 100 most influential women.

In 2022, she was named Insurance Personality of the Year at The British Insurance Awards and was recognised as one of the 100 Most Influential Women in Finance by Financial News. Most recently she has been named in the Financial Times' 25 most influential women of 2022.

Personal life 
Blanc lives in Hampshire and is married with two daughters.

She is interested in cycling and is a supporter of Welsh Rugby. She has a large collection of shoes, which have their own Twitter account. Blanc is an accomplished piano player and when growing up her ambition was to be a professional musician.

References

1967 births
Aviva people
Living people
Alumni of the University of Leeds
Alumni of the University of Liverpool
British chief executives
Welsh chief executives
People from Treherbert